The Santa Marta tinamou, Crypturellus erythropus idoneus, is a subspecies of tinamou that was recognized as a species by most authorities until 2006.  It is found in northern South America.

Etymology
Crypturellus is formed from three Latin or Greek words: kruptos meaning covered or hidden, oura meaning tail, and ellus meaning diminutive.  Therefore, Crypturellus means small hidden tail.

Taxonomy
The Santa Marta tinamou is a member of the paleognaths, a group that includes the flightless ratites, with the tinamous being the only family that flies. Up until 2006 they were generally accepted as a separate species; however, that year the SACC rejected a proposal to separate this species out and thus they are now generally regarded as part of Crypturellus erythropus.

Range
They are located in the northwestern portion of Venezuela and northeastern Colombia.

Footnotes

References
 
 
 
 
 

Crypturellus
Birds of Venezuela
Birds of Colombia
Birds described in 1919
Taxa named by W. E. Clyde Todd